Chris Camilleri (born 4 March 1954) is a Welsh former rugby union and professional rugby league footballer who played in the 1970s and 1980s.

International honours
Chris Camilleri won caps for Wales (RL) while at Barrow in 1980 against France, while at Widnes in 1982 against Australia, and while at Cardiff City (Bridgend) Blue Dragons in 1984 against England, and won caps for Great Britain (RL) while at Barrow in 1980 against New Zealand (2 matches).

County honours
Chris Camilleri represented Cumbria.

References

External links
(archived by web.archive.org) Barrow RL's great Britons
Statistics at rugby.widnes.tv

1954 births
Living people
Barrow Raiders players
Cardiff City Blue Dragons players
Cardiff RFC players
Cumbria rugby league team players
Footballers who switched code
Great Britain national rugby league team players
London Broncos players
Rugby league wingers
Wales national rugby league team players
Welsh rugby league players
Welsh rugby union players
Widnes Vikings players